Stefan Laggner (born 17 September 1958) is an Austrian weightlifter. He competed in the men's super heavyweight event at the 1984 Summer Olympics.

References

External links
 

1958 births
Living people
Austrian male weightlifters
Olympic weightlifters of Austria
Weightlifters at the 1984 Summer Olympics
Place of birth missing (living people)